This is a list of people who have served as Custos Rotulorum of Hampshire.

William Paulet, 1st Marquess of Winchester bef. 1544 – aft. 1558
John Paulet, 2nd Marquess of Winchester bef. 1562–1576
Sir Francis Walsingham bef. 1577–1590
George Carey, 2nd Baron Hunsdon bef. 1594–1603
Henry Wriothesley, 3rd Earl of Southampton bef. 1605–1624
Sir Henry Wallop 1624–1642
Thomas Wriothesley, 4th Earl of Southampton 1642–1646, 1660–1667
Joceline Percy, 11th Earl of Northumberland 1667–1670
Charles Paulet, 6th Marquess of Winchester 1670–1676
James Annesley, Baron Annesley 1676–1681
Edward Noel, 1st Earl of Gainsborough 1681–1688
James FitzJames, 1st Duke of Berwick 1688
For later custodes rotulorum, see Lord Lieutenant of Hampshire.

References
Institute of Historical Research - Custodes Rotulorum 1544-1646
Institute of Historical Research - Custodes Rotulorum 1660-1828

Hampshire